Yasin Khalid Abdelrahman Hamed (born 12 September 1999) is a professional footballer who plays as a forward for Hungarian club Békéscsaba on loan from Nyíregyháza. Born in Romania, he represents Sudan internationally.

Club career

Liberty Salonta
Born in Salonta, Romania, Hamed started his football career playing for the academy of Liberty Salonta, where George Pușcaș, Ovidiu Bic, Alexandru Sorian or Adrian Șut were launched.

Târgu Mureș
After a short period at LPS Bihorul Oradea, he moved to ASA 2013 Târgu Mureș where, on 23 July 2016, Hamed made his Liga I debut, in a match against Gaz Metan Mediaș, lost 1-2 by "the red and blues". Followed another two matches in the kits of the team from Târgu Mureș, then in the winter of 2017 the forward chose to leave the club.

Pandurii Târgu Jiu
Yasin signed in the early 2017 a contract with Pandurii Târgu Jiu, then on 15 May 2017, aged 17, he scored his first Liga I goal in a 3–2 victory over Concordia Chiajna. The relegation of Pandurii from the top-flight of the Romanian football league system was a bad news, but the 16 matches played for the team based in Oltenia and the good performances gave him a contract from the former champion CFR Cluj.

CFR Cluj
At CFR Cluj things have stalled, the club from Cluj-Napoca chose to use him in only 4 matches of the second team, squad that is playing in the Liga III, third tier, so in the winter of 2018 Hamed chose to leave "the railwaymen".

Sepsi OSK Sfântu Gheorghe
On 11 January 2018, Yasin Hamed signed an 18-month contract with the Liga I club Sepsi OSK Sfântu Gheorghe, where in almost two years played 47 matches and scored 5 goals, being an important member of the squad that was ranked 6th at the end of the 2018–19 Liga I season, the best ranking in the history of Sepsi and the town of Sfântu Gheorghe.

International career
Even if over the time Hamed expressed his desire to play for the Romania national football team, lack of interest from "The Tricolours" made him choose the Sudan national football team, for which he was selected for the first time in November 2019. The selection was made for two matches against São Tomé and Príncipe and South Africa, matches counting for the 2021 Africa Cup of Nations qualification Group C.

Personal life
Hamed was born in Salonta, Romania to a Romanian mother and Sudanese Nubian father.

Career statistics

Club

References

External links
  
 
 

1999 births
Living people
People from Salonta
People with acquired Sudanese citizenship
Sudanese footballers
Sudan international footballers
Romanian footballers
Romania youth international footballers
Sudanese people of Romanian descent
Romanian people of Sudanese descent
Romanian Muslims
Association football midfielders
Liga I players
Liga II players
ASA 2013 Târgu Mureș players
CS Pandurii Târgu Jiu players
CFR Cluj players
Sepsi OSK Sfântu Gheorghe players
FK Csíkszereda Miercurea Ciuc players
Sudanese expatriate footballers
Romanian expatriate footballers
Expatriate footballers in Hungary
Romanian expatriate sportspeople in Hungary
2021 Africa Cup of Nations players